Delta Force is a tactical first-person shooter developed and published by NovaLogic. It was released for Microsoft Windows in 1998, and re-released on Steam in 2009. Delta Force was designed to be a military simulation loosely based on the United States' Delta Force.

Gameplay
The player assumes the role of a Delta Force operator who takes part in military operations in various theatres. Objectives typically involve the elimination of a hostile presence in a region, assassinating a high-profile target, destroying military equipment or escorting POWs or civilians to an extraction point. Depending on the mission the player also needs to make it to an extraction point himself after fulfilling all other objectives. All five campaigns are available from the get-go and additional missions are unlocked as previous ones are completed. Sometimes multiple missions are unlocked at once and it is up to the player which order to play them in. The game features 40 missions in total.

Equipment
Before each mission the player is able to choose his equipment. Default loadouts differ from mission to mission but the player can exchange it without any restrictions. The inventory is based on three slots: one for the main weapon, one for extra equipment and one for a sidearm.

Multiplayer
Delta Force also features LAN and online multiplayer for up to 32 players. All missions from the singleplayer campaign can be played cooperatively with additional players replacing the AI-controlled Delta Force operatives. Additionally deathmatch, king of the hill and capture the flag are available, along with team variations.

Development
Delta Force uses NovaLogic's own proprietary Voxel Space engine, known from their earlier games such as the Comanche series, which uses voxels to visualise terrain while polygons are used for rendering characters, vehicles, buildings and other details. This method allowed for draw distances and terrain detail unseen in first person shooters at the time and supported the game's attempt to simulate realistic outdoor combat at distances of up to several hundred meters. A limitation of the engine was that it did not support any form of 3D acceleration.

Reception

The game received "favorable" reviews according to video game review aggregator GameRankings. GameSpots Michael Ryan called it "a very impressive game overall", particularly praising the game's mission and sound design, albeit pointing out its outdated visuals. He also drew comparisons to Tom Clancy's Rainbow Six, released earlier the same year, but noted Delta Force's limited preparation options compared to the latter. He also praised the multiplayer mode but noted that technical problems made it hard to play. PC Gamers Todd Vaughn also drew comparisons to Rainbow Six but noted Delta Force's focus on long-distance fights and lower level of realism. He concluded: "Overall, Delta Force is a surprising and welcome addition to the genre that uses just the right mix [of] action and tactics to set itself apart from the crowd." Next Generation wrote, "Though Delta Forces standalone play is often uninspired, the multiplayer is one of the most satisfying gaming experiences available today."

Sequels
The game was successful enough to receive a direct sequel, Delta Force 2, the following year and spawn a long-running series. The latest game in the series is Delta Force: Xtreme 2, released in 2009. Another game titled Delta Force: Angel Falls was announced but never released due to NovaLogic's closure in 2016.

Inspired by the popularity of Ridley Scott's war film Black Hawk Down, chronicling the Battle of Mogadishu, NovaLogic developed a Delta Force game with the same theme titled Delta Force: Black Hawk Down, which was released in 2003. Due to the rise in popularity of military-themed multiplayer shooters with vehicular combat, most notably DICE's Battlefield series, NovaLogic also developed a multiplayer focused spin-off of the Delta Force series titled Joint Operations: Typhoon Rising, released in 2004.

References

External links

 

Delta Force (video game series)
Embracer Group franchises
1998 video games
First-person shooters
Windows games
Windows-only games
Cooperative video games
Tactical shooter video games
Video games about Delta Force
Video games developed in the United States
Video games featuring protagonists of selectable gender
Video games with voxel graphics
Video games set in Peru
Video games set in Chad
Video games set in Indonesia
Video games set in Uzbekistan
Video games set in Russia
NovaLogic games